The 1977 Giro d'Italia was the 60th edition of the Giro d'Italia, one of cycling's Grand Tours. The Giro began with a prologue individual time trial in Bacoli on 20 May, and Stage 10 occurred on 30 May with a mountainous stage to Salsomaggiore Terme. The race finished in Milan on 12 June.

Prologue
20 May 1977 — Bacoli to Monte di Procida,  (ITT)

Stage 1
21 May 1977 — Lago Miseno to Avellino,

Stage 2a
22 May 1977 — Avellino to Foggia,

Stage 2b
22 May 1977 — Foggia to Foggia,

Stage 3
23 May 1977 — Foggia to Isernia,

Stage 4
24 May 1977 — Isernia to Pescara,

Stage 5
25 May 1977 — Pescara to Monteluco di Spoleto,

Stage 6a
26 May 1977 — Spoleto to Gabicce Mare,

Stage 6b
26 May 1977 — Gabicce Mare to Gabicce Mare,

Stage 7
27 May 1977 — Gabicce Mare to Forlì,

Stage 8a
28 May 1977 — Forlì to Circuito del Mugello,

Stage 8b
28 May 1977 — Circuito del Mugello to Circuito del Mugello,

Stage 9
29 May 1977 — Lucca to Pisa,  (ITT)

Stage 10
30 May 1977 — Pisa to Salsomaggiore Terme,

References

1977 Giro d'Italia
Giro d'Italia stages